The 12th South East Asian Table Tennis Championships 2022 were played in Bangkok, Thailand from 23 to 28 June 2022. The Table Tennis Association of Thailand hosted both the 12th SEATTC and the 26th SEAJCTTC. Both championships were played in the same venue at the Fashion Island Hall 3rd.

Schedule
Five individual and two team events were contested.

Source:

Participating

Participating nations

 Cambodia (4)
 Indonesia (8)
 Laos (6)
 Malaysia (10)
 Philippines (10)
 Singapore (10)
 Thailand (10)
 Vietnam (10)

Medal summary

Medal table

Events

See also
Asian Table Tennis Union
Asian Table Tennis Championships
26th South East Asian Junior and Cadet Table Tennis Championships 2022

References

South East Asian Table Tennis Championships
South East Asian Table Tennis Championships
South East Asian Table Tennis Championships
Table Tennis Championships
Table tennis competitions in Thailand
South East Asian Table Tennis Championships